Bathyomphalus contortus is a species of small air-breathing freshwater snail, an aquatic pulmonate gastropod mollusk in the family Planorbidae, the ram's horn snails and their allies.

Distribution
The distribution of this species is Palearctic:Eurasian Wide-temperate.

It occurs in countries and islands including:
 Great Britain
 Czech Republic - least concern (LC)
 Germany
 Netherlands
 Poland
 Slovakia

Description
The 1-2 × 3-6 mm shell has up to 7-8 densely coiled and rounded whorls with deep suture. The whorls are higher than wide, the lower side is almost flat, the upper side with a large umbilicus which is more than 1/3 of the shell diameter. The aperture is narrow. Shell colour is reddish horny brown, often with black or brown encrustations, finely striated. The animal is blackish dark red, tentacles very long, eyes small and black.

Habitat
This small snail lives in freshwater habitats especially small, impoverished water-bodies and drains and marshy or peaty pools. It is also found in floodplain marshes. It seldom occurs in larger water-bodies. Bathyomphalus contortus is tolerant of acidic conditions as is Radix balthica. In Ireland it is  often the only species present in pools or drains in and around raised bogs.

References

External links

Bathyomphalus images at  Consortium for the Barcode of Life

Planorbidae
Palearctic molluscs
Gastropods described in 1758
Taxa named by Carl Linnaeus